Gandom Khvab (also Romanized as Gandom Khvāb and Gandom Khavāb) is a village in Darzab Rural District, in the Central District of Mashhad County, Razavi Khorasan Province, Iran. At the 2006 census, its population was 80, in 23 families.

References 

Populated places in Mashhad County